The Pârâul Mijlociu is a left tributary of the river Geamărtălui in Romania. It discharges into the Geamărtălui in Gaia.

References

Rivers of Romania
Rivers of Dolj County